OpenPKG is an open source package management system for Unix. It is based on the well known RPM-system and allows easy and unified installation of packages onto common Unix-platforms (Solaris, Linux and FreeBSD).

The project was launched by Ralf S. Engelschall in November 2000 and in June 2005 it offered  more than 880 freely available packages.

External links

The OpenPKG Project
The OpenPKG Corporation
The OpenPKG Foundation

Free package management systems